Internationals Network for Public Schools is an educational nonprofit supporting International high schools and academies, serving newly arrived immigrants who are English language learners (ELLs), in New York, California, Kentucky, Maryland, Virginia, and Washington, DC.  Internationals Network also partners with other schools and districts across the country.

Mission
The mission of Internationals Network is to provide quality education for recently arrived immigrants by growing and sustaining a strong national network of innovative International High Schools, while broadening our impact by sharing proven best practices and influencing policy for English learners on a national scale.

History
Internationals Network’s history of academic success began in 1985 with the founding of the first high school on the campus of LaGuardia Community College, a collaborative effort between the New York City Department of Education and the City University of New York. In response to the many educational challenges faced by English language learners within district schools, The International High School at LaGuardia was designed specifically to provide quality education for these students. During the next nine years, two additional International High Schools were opened in Brooklyn and Manhattan. To facilitate interschool collaboration and learning, these schools joined together in 1995 to form the International Schools Partnership. In 2001, a fourth school was established in the Bronx. When the Bill and Melinda Gates Foundation initiated educational reform through small school development for those students most underserved, they approached the Partnership to recreate its successful model to promote high school age English language learner achievement across the country.
Born from the International Schools Partnership, Internationals Network for Public Schools was formalized as a 501(c)3 nonprofit in 2004 to support existing schools and create additional International High Schools nationwide. As an intermediary working closely with local education departments and community based organizations, Internationals now supports 19 International High Schools and Small Learning Communities in New York City, California’s Bay Area, Alexandria, Virginia, and Washington, DC.

Based on Internationals core work – almost 30 years of staff and practitioner experience in developing, refining and adapting the Internationals’ Approach in its schools, Internationals now collaborates nationally with districts, schools and school development partners to bring its professional development services to support educators who teach English language learners across the nation. Additionally, Internationals engages with state and local departments of education to increase policy maker awareness of the regulatory issues that both inhibit and promote best practices in ELL education and immigrant family supports.

Internationals Approach
At International high schools, a badge of prestige replaces the “stigma” of immigrant status for students, families, and faculty. The Internationals Approach holds that near native fluency in English and proficiency in a second language are valuable resources when it comes to achieving professional and social success in the United States and the global economy and participating fully in democratic society. In International high schools and academies, every teacher is considered a language teacher as well as a teacher of academic content and skills. The educational process takes place in a heterogeneous, learner-centered, collaborative, and activity-based environment. Students are organized in diverse clusters that often work with the same team of teachers over 1–2 years. Classes are mixed according to age, grade, academic ability, prior schooling, native language, and linguistic proficiency. They are interdisciplinary and rigorous, and the curriculum includes literature, social studies, math, science, the arts, technology, and physical education.

The Internationals’ pedagogical approach to educating English language learners is based upon 5 Core Principles:
 Heterogeneity and collaboration : schools and classrooms are heterogeneous and collaborative structures that build on the strengths of each member of the school community to optimize learning
 Experiential learning : expansion of the 21st century schools beyond the four walls of the building motivates adolescents and enhances their capacity to successfully participate in modern society
 Language and content integration : strong language skills develop most effectively in context and emerge most naturally in a purposeful, language-rich, interdisciplinary, and experiential program
 Localized autonomy and responsibility : linking autonomy and responsibility at every level within a learning community allows all members to contribute to their fullest potential
 One learning model for all : every member of our school community experiences the same learning model, maximizing an environment of mutual academic support. Thus all members of our school community work in diverse, collaborative groups on hands-on projects; put another way, the model for adult learning and student learning mirror each other.

Awards and recognition
The Internationals Approach to teaching has been studied by researchers at Stanford University School Redesign Network and the Graduate Center of the City University of New York.  The Stanford study, led by Linda Darling-Hammond and her team of researchers, found "the Internationals Network for Public Schools (Internationals) is an important model that originated in New York City and has shown itself to be both successful and adaptable" in California. Michelle Fine and a team of researchers from the Graduate Center of the City University of New York found that students at the three oldest International schools outperformed both English Language Learners and Native English Speakers (in New York City) in graduation rates and college going rates. The International schools also maintained lower drop out rates than ELL students and English only students.

In 2009 the Migration Policy Institute (MPI) announced the four winners of its inaugural E Pluribus Unum national awards for exceptional immigrant integration initiatives.  Internationals Network for Public Schools was named for its work teaching late-entry immigrant students.

Students
Today the network serves approximately 6,000 students annually from 90 countries.  Over 90% of students receive free or reduced price lunch, and 86 percent of students come from low-income families. High percentages of students have had interrupted formal education due to political, social, or economic factors in their native countries. 70 percent of students have been separated from one or both parents during their family's immigration to the United States.

Schools
The International High School at LaGuardia College
Manhattan International High School*
Brooklyn International High School
Bronx International High School
Prospect Heights International High School
The Flushing International High School
Pan American International High School
International Community High School
*International High School at Lafayette
Oakland International High School
Pan American International High School at Monroe
San Francisco International High School
ELLIS Preparatory Academy
The International High School at Union Square
Crotona International High School*
Claremont International High School*
International High School for Health Sciences*
TCW International Academy* in Alexandria, VA
International Academy at Cardozo HS* in Washington, DC
International High School at Langley Park
International High School at Largo
International Academy at Francis C Hammond Middle School

References

 Internationals Network for Public Schools Website

International high schools
International schools in the United States
Education reform
Small schools movement